Area codes 601 and 769 are telephone area codes in the North American Numbering Plan (NANP) for central and southern Mississippi, excluding the three counties of the Gulf Coast. 

Area code 601 was one of the original North American area codes assigned in 1947. Until 1997, it served the entire state of Mississippi.

Despite the state's relatively stagnant population growth, 601 was close to exhaustion by the mid-1990s due to the proliferation of cell phones and pagers. In 1997, the far southeastern tip of the state, including Biloxi and the Gulf Coast, was split off as area code 228. In 1999, area code 662 was created in the northern half of Mississippi, including the Mississippi side of the Memphis area.

The 1999 split was intended as a long-term solution, but within five years, 601 was close to exhaustion due to the proliferation of cell phones, particularly in the Jackson area. In 2006, Mississippi's first overlay area code, 769, was approved for use to overlay 601.  Ten-digit dialing became mandatory in central Mississippi later that year.

Service area
The numbering plan area includes the following cities:

Bolton
Brandon
Braxton
Brookhaven
Canton
Carthage
Clinton
Columbia
Conehatta
Crystal Springs
Decatur
Edwards
Florence
Flowood
Forest
Hattiesburg
Hazlehurst
Jackson
Laurel
Lucedale
Lumberton
Madison
Magee
Magnolia
McComb
Mendenhall
Meridian
Monticello
Mount Olive
Morton
Natchez
Newton
Ovett
Pearl
Pelahatchie
Petal
Philadelphia
Picayune
Poplarville
Port Gibson
Prentiss
Puckett
Purvis
Quitman
Raleigh
Raymond
Richland
Ridgeland
Terry
Tylertown
Utica
Vicksburg
Washington
Waynesboro
Wesson
Wiggins

References
Area code history. AreaCode-Info.com.
Bellsouth.com

External links

601 and 769
601 and 769
Telecommunications-related introductions in 1947
1947 establishments in Mississippi
2005 establishments in Mississippi